Veterans Memorial Early College High School is a public high school in Brownsville, Texas, United States. It is one of six high schools operated by the Brownsville Independent School District and classified as a 5a school by the UIL. In 2015, the school was rated "Met Standard" by the Texas Education Agency.

Athletics
The Veterans Memorial Chargers compete in the following sports:

Baseball
Basketball
Cross country
Football
Golf
Powerlifting
Soccer
Softball
Swimming and diving
Tennis
Track and field
Volleyball

Clubs and associations
Health Occupations Students of America
Skills USA
Technology Student Association
UIL One Act Play

References

External links
 

Education in Brownsville, Texas
Brownsville Independent School District high schools
Buildings and structures in Brownsville, Texas